Tichfield Junction is an unincorporated community in Coteau Rural Municipality No. 255, Saskatchewan, Canada. The community is located 30 km south of the Town of Outlook east of highway 44  at the intersection of Township road 270 & the Canadian National Railway junction on the south shore of Coteau Lake.

See also 
List of communities in Saskatchewan

Coteau No. 255, Saskatchewan
Unincorporated communities in Saskatchewan
Ghost towns in Saskatchewan